Ward Walsh is a former running back in the National Football League. He played with the Houston Oilers during the 1972 NFL season before splitting the following season between the Oilers and the Green Bay Packers.

References

People from Paradise, California
Houston Oilers players
Green Bay Packers players
American football running backs
Colorado Buffaloes football players
1947 births
Living people
Players of American football from California